Csilla Földi (born 25 August 1968) is a retired Hungarian weightlifter who was active between 1987 and 2000. She won eight medals at the European championships, including five golds in 1989–1993. Her father Imre Földi was a 1972 Olympic champion in weightlifting.

References

1968 births
Living people
Hungarian female weightlifters
People from Tata, Hungary
European Weightlifting Championships medalists
Sportspeople from Komárom-Esztergom County
20th-century Hungarian women
21st-century Hungarian women